Masi is a name of a village in Talla Gewar, Chaukhutiya Block of district Almora in Uttarakhand, India. This village located near eastern bank of Ramganga River. Mostly villager of this village called as Masiwal however there are various notable villages Adigram fuloria, Bhatoli, Chauna, Dubari, Kanre, Naugaon, Unchavahan. The village is home to an annual seven-day Somnath (i.e., Shivan) festival that involves throwing stones into the Ramganga river.

Transportation
Pant Nagar Airport is the nearest airbase. The nearest railway stations are at Kathgodam and Ram Nagar.
Chaukhutiya block is the nearest block from there which is about 13 km away from there.
Masi Pincode is 263658 With 29.8156491 Latitude and 79.2803459 Longitude.

Gallery

References

Villages in Almora district